Carl-Henrik "C.-H." Hermansson (14 December 1917 – 26 July 2016) was a Swedish politician who served as chairman of the Communist Party of Sweden (during his leadership renamed the Left Party – Communists) from 1964 to 1975 and member of parliament from 1963 to 1985. He was a major force in redirecting Left Party policies away from Moscow loyalism towards Eurocommunism and Scandinavian Popular Socialism. He wrote several books regarding capitalism and the owners of the large corporations, as well as on communists and the policies of the left.

At the time of Joseph Stalin's death in 1953, Hermansson praised Stalin as a brilliant scientist and a great leader. He subsequently regretted this and referred to his own words about Stalin as reprehensible.

References

Further reading
 Schmidt, W. 2005. C.H. Hermansson: En politisk biografi. Stockholm: Leopard förlag.

1917 births
2016 deaths
People from Bollnäs
Members of the Riksdag from the Left Party (Sweden)
Swedish male writers
Swedish communists
Swedish anti-capitalists